Krzysztof Lijewski (born 7 July 1983) is a Polish former handball player. He received a silver medal with the Polish team at the 2007 World Men's Handball Championship and a bronze medal at the 2009 World Men's Handball Championship in Croatia and at the 2015 World Men's Handball Championship in Qatar. He participated at the 2008 Summer Olympics, where Poland finished 5th and at the 2016 Summer Olympics, where Poland finished 4th.

His brother is Marcin Lijewski.

Sporting achievements

State awards
 2007  Gold Cross of Merit
 2015  Knight's Cross of Polonia Restituta

References

External links

1983 births
Living people
People from Ostrów Wielkopolski
Polish male handball players
Olympic handball players of Poland
Handball players at the 2008 Summer Olympics
Handball players at the 2016 Summer Olympics
Expatriate handball players
Polish expatriates in Germany
Rhein-Neckar Löwen players
Handball-Bundesliga players
Vive Kielce players
Sportspeople from Greater Poland Voivodeship